Mohabbat Chor Di Maine is Pakistani romantic drama television series produced by Abdullah Kadwani and Asad Qureshi under 7th Sky Entertainment. This Urdu language drama serial was written by Naila Ansari and directed by Shaqielle Khan. It premiered on 7 October 2021, and aired daily at 9:00 p.m. on Geo TV.

Plot 
Komal couldn't imagine another tragedy is yet to turn her world upside down. After learning about her husband's alternate life, Komal sees that her former lover, Hazim, has returned. However, the bittersweet memories from the past continue to trigger her and she decides that she will not allow any man to make a mockery of her, at least not in Hazim's presence, who had already once left her for another woman. While everyone could see her married life come crumbling down, Komal remains in denial and decides that she will make her husband, Omer, stay even if it means co-existing with the second wife.

However, her huge compromise perfectly overshadows her true intention. She won't be letting anyone get away with betrayal.

Cast 

 Hajra Yamin as Komal 
 Mohsin Abbas Haider as Omer; Komal's husband 
 Mariyam Nafees as Sehar; Omer's second wife 
 Farhan Ahmed Malhi as Hazim; Komal's former fiancé 
 Rushna Khan as Zaini; Omer's widowed sister 
 Tariq Jamil as Mohsin; Komal's father 
 Seemi Pasha as Shehnaz; Mohsin's second wife
 Haris Waheed as Bazil; Komal's half-brother; Mohsin & Shehnaz's son
 Zainab Qayyum as Tabinda; Hazim's mother; Shehnaz's sister 
 Fareeha Jabeen as Fouzia; Sehar's mother
 Fahima Awan as Aniba; Komal's friend
 Mohsin Aijaz as Sarfaraz; brother of Sehar's deceased first husband 
 Manahil Naveed as Filza; Komal & Omer's daughter
 Rimha Ahmed as Aleena; Hazim's sister; Tabinda's daughter
 Salma Qadir as Noori; Komal's maid

Soundtrack 
The official soundtrack of Aik Gunah Aur Sahi was sung by the legendary singer Sahir Ali Bagga, who is also the man behind its music composition and lyrics.

References

External links
g

Pakistani romantic drama television series
Geo TV original programming
2021 Pakistani television series debuts
7th Sky Entertainment